In an aqueous solution, precipitation is the process of transforming a dissolved substance into an insoluble solid from a super-saturated solution. The solid formed is called the precipitate. In case of an inorganic chemical reaction leading to precipitation, the chemical reagent causing the solid to form is called the precipitant.

The clear liquid remaining above the precipitated or the centrifuged solid phase is also called the 'supernate' or 'supernatant'. 

The notion of precipitation can also be extended to other domains of chemistry (organic chemistry and biochemistry) and even be applied to the solid phases (e.g., metallurgy and alloys) when solid impurities segregate from a solid phase.

Supersaturation
The precipitation of a compound may occur when its concentration exceeds its solubility. This can be due to temperature changes, solvent evaporation, or by mixing solvents. Precipitation occurs more rapidly from a strongly supersaturated solution.

The formation of a precipitate can be caused by a chemical reaction. When a barium chloride solution reacts with sulphuric acid, a white precipitate of barium sulfate is formed. When a potassium iodide solution reacts with a lead(II) nitrate solution, a yellow precipitate of lead(II) iodide is formed.

Nucleation
An important stage of the precipitation process is the onset of nucleation. The creation of a solid particle implies the formation of an interface with the solution. This involves energy changes depending on the dissolution reaction free energy (endothermic or exothermic process accompanied by an entropy increase) and the relative surface energy developed between the solid and the solution. If energy changes are not favorable, or without suitable nucleation sites, no precipitation occurs and the solution remain supersaturated.

Inorganic chemistry

Precipitation in aqueous solution

A common example of precipitation reaction in aqueous solution is that of silver chloride. When silver nitrate (AgNO3) is added to a solution of potassium chloride (KCl) the precipitation of a white solid (AgCl) is observed.
AgNO3 + KCl -> AgCl (v) + KNO3

The ionic equation allows to write this reaction by detailing the dissociated ions present in aqueous solution.
Ag+ + NO3^- + K+ + Cl^- -> AgCl (v) + K+ + NO3^-

Reductive precipitation

The Walden reductor  is an illustration of a reduction reaction directly accompanied by the precipitation of a less soluble compound because of its lower chemical valence: 
Cu + 2 Ag+ -> Cu^2+ + 2 Ag
The Walden reductor made of tiny silver crystals obtained by the immersion of a copper wire into a solution of silver nitrate is used to reduce  to their lower valence any metallic ion located above the silver couple  in the redox potential scale.

Precipitate colors

Many compounds containing metal ions produce precipitates with distinctive colors. The following are some typical colors for various metals. However, many of these compounds can produce colors very different from those listed.

Many compounds often form white precipitates.

Anion/cation qualitative analysis

Precipitate formation is useful in the detection of the type of cation in a salt. To do this, an alkali first reacts with the unknown salt to produce a precipitate that is the hydroxide of the unknown salt. To identify the cation, the color of the precipitate and its solubility in excess are noted. Similar processes are often used in sequence – for example, a barium nitrate solution will react with sulfate ions to form a solid barium sulfate precipitate, indicating that it is likely that sulfate ions are present.

Colloidal suspensions
Without sufficient attraction forces (e.g., Van der Waals force) to aggregate the solid particles together and to remove them from solution by gravity (settling), they remain in suspension and form colloids. Sedimentation can be accelerated by high speed centrifugation. The compact mass thus obtained is sometimes referred to as a 'pellet'.

Digestion and precipitates ageing
Digestion, or precipitate ageing, happens when a freshly formed precipitate is left, usually at a higher temperature, in the solution from which it precipitates. It results in purer and larger recrystallized particles. The physico-chemical process underlying digestion is called Ostwald ripening.

Organic chemistry

While precipitation reactions can be used for making pigments, removing ions from solution in water treatment, and in classical qualitative inorganic analysis, precipitation is also commonly used to isolate the products of an organic reaction during workup and purification operations. Ideally, the product of the reaction is insoluble in the solvent used for the reaction. Thus, it precipitates as it is formed, preferably forming pure crystals. An example of this would be the synthesis of porphyrins in refluxing propionic acid. By cooling the reaction mixture to room temperature, crystals of the porphyrin precipitate, and are collected by filtration on a Büchner filter as illustrated by the photograph here beside:

Precipitation may also occur when an antisolvent (a solvent in which the product is insoluble) is added, drastically reducing the solubility of the desired product. Thereafter, the precipitate may be easily separated by decanting, filtration, or by centrifugation. An example would be the synthesis of Cr3+tetraphenylporphyrin chloride: water is added to the dimethylformamide (DMF) solution in which the reaction occurred, and the product precipitates. Precipitation is useful in purifying many other products: e.g., crude bmim-Cl is taken up in acetonitrile, and dropped into ethyl acetate, where it precipitates.

Biochemistry
Proteins purification and separation can be performed by precipitation in changing the nature of the solvent or the value of its dielectric constant (e.g., by replacing water by ethanol), or by increasing the ionic strength of the solution. As proteins have complex tertiary and quaternary structures due to their specific folding and various weak intermolecular interactions (e.g., hydrogen bridges), these superstructures can be modified and proteins denaturated and precipitated. Another important application of an antisolvent is in ethanol precipitation of DNA.

Metallurgy and alloys
In solid phases, precipitation occurs if the concentration of one solid is above the solubility limit in the host solid, due to e.g. rapid quenching or
ion implantation, and the temperature is high enough that diffusion can lead to segregation into precipitates. Precipitation in solids is routinely used to synthesize nanoclusters.

In metallurgy, precipitation from a solid solution is also a way to strengthen alloys.

Precipitation of ceramic phases in metallic alloys such as zirconium hydrides in zircaloy cladding of nuclear fuel pins can also render metallic alloys brittle and lead to their mechanical failure. Correctly mastering the precise temperature and pressure conditions when cooling down spent nuclear fuels is therefore essential to avoid damaging their cladding and to preserve the integrity of the spent fuel elements on the long term in dry storage casks and in geological disposal conditions.

Industrial processes
Hydroxide precipitation is probably the most widely used industrial precipitation process in which metal hydroxides are formed by adding calcium hydroxide (slaked lime) or sodium hydroxide (caustic soda) as precipitant.

History
Powders derived from different precipitation processes have also historically been known as 'flowers'.

See also
 Coprecipitation
 Effervescence, the "up-arrow"
 Salting in
 Salting out

References

Additional reading

External links

 Precipitation reactions of certain cations
 Digestion Instruments
 A Thesis on pattern formation in precipitation reactions

Liquid-solid separation